Osmery is a commune in the Cher department in the Centre-Val de Loire region of France.

Geography
The village lies on the right bank of the Airain, which flows west-northwest through the southern part of the commune.

Population

Sights
 The church of St. Julien, dating from the twelfth century
 The fifteenth-century chateau of Défens
 A seventeenth-century chapel

See also
Communes of the Cher department

References

External links

Annuaire Mairie website 
Osmery.fr 

Communes of Cher (department)